Orikkal Oridathu is a 1985 Malayalam film directed by Jeassy, starring Madhu, Prem Naseer, Sreevidya, Rahman.

Plot
The film begins showing the relationship between two college mates, Sethu and Soniya. The film takes a severe turn when Soniya is brutally murdered on the eve of the college day celebrations. Sethu, who is actually innocent, is arrested due to circumstantial evidence. He breaks out of the prison in order to find the actual culprit. In the end, he discovers that one of his friends was behind the murder.

Cast
 Rahman as Sethu
 Rohini as Soniya, Sethu's lover
 Prem Nazeer as Kesava Kurup, Sethu's uncle
 Madhu as Menon, Sethu's father
 Soman as Raghavan, the prisoner in the jail
 Srividya as Subhadra, Sethu's mother
 Shanavas as Nasser, Sethu's friend
 Santhosh as Baby Thomas, Sethu's friend
 Kunchan as Shambu Prasad, Sethu's friend
 Sankaradi as Kutti Naanu, Soniya's father
 Adoor Bhasi as Kaimal, Kesava Kurup's clerk
 Mala Aravindan as Shivan Pillai, the peon at the college
 T. P. Madhavan as Girishan, police officer
KPAC Lalitha as Gouri

Soundtrack
The music was composed by Raveendran with lyrics by Poovachal Khader.

References

External links
 

Films directed by Jeassy
1985 films
1980s Malayalam-language films